Whare Ra is the name of a building in Havelock North in the Hawkes Bay region of New Zealand. The building housed the New Zealand branch of the magical order the Stella Matutina.  It was designed and the construction overseen by one of New Zealand's most famous architects, and a senior member of the Order, James Chapman-Taylor.

Whare Ra was one of the last surviving temples that could trace its lineage back to the original Hermetic Order of the Golden Dawn.  It was the only temple to operate in a permanent, purpose-built building.

Early preparations

The foundations for the Order in New Zealand were laid by Reginald Gardiner (1872-1959). Born in New South Wales, Australia, he was the son of an Anglican vicar and brother of the Anglican vicar of St Luke's Church, Havelock North, New Zealand, where he finally settled in 1907.  He formed about him an artistic, cultural and spiritual group whose activities became known as the "Havelock Work", and produced a publication called The Forerunner.  The Havelock Work grew and in time the group became known as the Society of the Southern Cross.

In 1910, Revd. Father J. Fitzgerald travelled to New Zealand on Church business, and was introduced to the group.  He was suitably impressed, and prior to his return to Britain, promised to stay in touch and to do what he could to help.  One of the last G.H. Chiefs of the Order later recollected:

In due course he wrote that if further progress were to be made, that certain people of his acquaintance would need to come out from England.

In 1912 Dr. Robert Felkin, Chief of the Order of the Stella Matutina arrived, assisted by his appointment as Inspector of the Australasian Colleges of the Societas Rosicruciana in Anglia by William Wynn Westcott, one of the original Chiefs of the Hermetic Order of the Golden Dawn and Supreme Magus of the S.R.I.A.

Founding of the Smaragdum Thallasses Temple No 49

Travelling with his wife and daughter, he initiated a group of twenty-four members into the Order, twelve of whom were advanced to the "Second Order".  A sizeable piece of land on Tauroa Road in Havelock North was donated, and a home for the Order constructed, which they named “Whare Ra”, or House of the Sun.  It was in the basement of this house that the large Temple was built.

During their three-month stay, sufficient members had been initiated to make a beginning, and the building commissioned and sufficiently advanced to enable its Consecration.  Before leaving New Zealand to return to England, a Warrant was issued establishing the Smaragdum Thallasses Temple No. 49 of the Order of the Stella Matutina. The three Chiefs that appeared on the Warrant were Reginald Gardiner, Mason Chambers, and probably Harold Large (or possibly Thomas Chambers).

A trust had been set up to manage the monetary affairs of the Order, with the trustees being Mason Chambers, his wife Margaret Chambers, the younger John Chambers, and Reginald Gardiner.  The trust deed stated that the group was formed:

John von Dadelszen, who spent most of his adult life in the Order, and who had been a Temple Warden and one of its last Chiefs, stated that the Order:

A contemporary of John von Dadelszen, and fellow Chief Archie Shaw, wrote of the role of the three Chiefs, in his 1960 address to members:

The Work
Students who had been initiated into the Order had to follow a curriculum of activities.

Topics studied included comparative religion, mythology, geomancy, astrology, tarot, cabala, alchemy and tatwas.

After a minimum prescribed period, and having passed appropriate examinations, a student would then progress to the next grade, and receive another “Advancement” through a ceremonial experience. In all, there was one initiation ceremony and 10 advancement ceremonies used in the Order, although arguably the last one or possible two were reserved for a small number of very senior members and leaders of the group.

The Order was really two orders, an “Outer” or “First Order” where basic disciplines and rudimentary knowledge were taught, and an “Inner” or “Second Order” where in essence the member received advanced teachings to enable them to become effectively priests, capable of making their own connection with the divine.  Admission to the Second Order was by invitation only.

The “Work” of the Second Order took the theory and knowledge taught in the First Order, and turned it into ceremonial and ritual with the intent of strengthening the link with the divine, personal spiritual enlightenment, and the advancement of life in general.

The core content of the study materials and the methods used by members of the Smaragdum Thallasses included almost all (if not all) of the original content of the Golden Dawn, verbatim.  However, some of the wording in the initiation and advancement ceremonies were changed by the Stella Matutina, which the Smaragdum Thallasses came out of, minimising masonic style references but by and large keeping the structure and intent the same as the original.

After time, and with decades of experience applying the methods of the Golden Dawn, the Smaragdum Thallasses also produce a plethora of new material unique to its membership. A natural renaissance of knowledge and expertise unfolded.

The temple prospers
In 1916, at the invitation of the members of the New Zealand branch, and with the offer of life tenancy of “Whare Ra”, Felkin and his family returned to New Zealand for good.   He issued a new constitution for the Order of the Stella Matutina in the same year, informing members that the Mother Temple of the Order was now in New Zealand.  The Order, governed by three ruling Chiefs, prospered under their leadership.  By the time of the death of Felkin in 1926, it had a very active membership and was well established – its membership included two Anglican Bishops, General Sir Arthur Russell, Lord Jellicoe, Governor General of New Zealand, members of Parliament, and local dignitaries and officials.

Entrance to the Temple, by the candidate for initiation, was via a secret staircase behind a wardrobe, located in Felkin's surgery.

In 1931 a devastating earthquake hit the area, and many buildings were levelled or damaged. With its fortress like construction, Whare Ra was unscathed.

Gardiner replaced Felkin as a Greatly Honoured Chief of the Order, and with Mrs and Miss Felkin, ruled for a further stable period of 33 years.

In its heyday during the 1930s, it has been estimated that its membership numbered some 300 men and woman, and during its 60-plus-year history that approximately 400–500 people had been initiated.  It was during this time that the Temple distanced itself from the affairs of the Stella Matutina in Britain, and renamed itself simply the Order of Smaragdum Thallasses.

In 1949, in the last issue of The Lantern, Mrs. Felkin stated:

In the Annual Report for year ending 31 December 1959, the Order's Cancellarius reported that:

In 1959 Gardiner and Mrs Felkin died, followed by Miss Felkin three years later.

During the late 1960s, Frater Albertus of the Paracelsus Research Society visited Whare Ra. He reported this visit to members of the society in one of their bulletins.

The "chiefs" as they are called, heading Whare Ra, Messrs. von Dadelszen and Salt and Mrs. Jones, whom we met proved to be very fine people with a fervent interest in perpetuating the work of the Golden Dawn, brought to New Zealand by Felkin before the first World War.

Decline
However, by 1978 it was clear that Whare Ra was a spent force.  On 24 August 1978 a letter was circulated to members announcing the closure:

Much to the regret of many esoteric historians they burnt most of the group's regalia, Temple furnishings and records.  Fortunately some things survived, including the Temple's pillars, the two sphinxes which flanked either side of the dais steps, and many copies of the rituals and lectures were  passed on and preserved.

Whare Ra is now in private hands, and has been registered as a Category I protected building by the New Zealand Historic Places Trust.

References

Religion in New Zealand
New religious movements
Hermetic Order of the Golden Dawn
Buildings and structures in the Hawke's Bay Region
History of the Hawke's Bay Region
1910s architecture in New Zealand
Heritage New Zealand Category 1 historic places in the Hawke's Bay Region